Mercedes-Benz Fashion Week Madrid, was known as Pasarela Cibeles until 2008 or Cibeles Madrid Fashion week up until 2012, is the principal platform to promote fashion in Spain. Based in Madrid and often takes place twice a year, in September 2008 held its edition No. 48. The No. 49 edition, which lasted two weeks, was held in February 2009. It is organized by IFEMA, the trade fair in Madrid. In the edition organized for September 18, 2009 they celebrate the 50th edition of the former Pasarela Cibeles.

Some of the notable attendees at MBFWM are Spain's Duchess of Alba, socialite and tabloid fixture Carmen Lomana, French socialite Beatrice D'Orleans, Russian model, Irina Shayk and also athletes like Cristiano Ronaldo Sergio Ramos, Kaka, Higuain, Ozil and Figo.

Some designers that showed their collections included: Davidelfin, Juan Duyos, Adolfo Dominguez, Andres Sarda, Aristocrazy, TCN and Juanjo Oliva.

References

External links
Web oficial
Especial 50 aniversario de Pasarela Cibeles

Spanish fashion
Fashion events in Spain
Culture in Madrid
Annual events in Spain
Fashion weeks
Events in Madrid